North Shore Railroad could refer to:

 Chicago North Shore and Milwaukee Railroad (North Shore Line)
 North Shore Railroad (Pennsylvania)
 North Shore Railroad (Long Island)
 North Shore Railroad (California)

See also 
 North Shore Branch
 North Shore Line (disambiguation)